2006 Emmy Awards may refer to:

 58th Primetime Emmy Awards, the 2006 Emmy Awards ceremony honoring primetime programming June 2005 – May 2006
 33rd Daytime Emmy Awards, the 2006 Emmy Awards ceremony honoring daytime programming during 2005
 27th Sports Emmy Awards, the 2006 Emmy Awards ceremony honoring sports programming during 2005
 34th International Emmy Awards, honoring international programming

Emmy Award ceremonies by year